Dhirendra Hiralal Waghela (born 11 August 1954) was the Chief Justice of the Bombay High Court and former Chief Justice of the Odisha High Court and Karnataka High Court.

Education and Legal practice
Justice Waghela stood first from Saurashtra University in General LL.B. as well as in Special LL.B. in 1974 and 1975, respectively. He took his master's degree in law in 1976–77. Waghela started his own practice in 1978. He practised in the Labour and Industrial courts. In 1999, he was called to the bench and assumed his office as Additional Judge of the High Court of Gujarat on 17 September 1999.

References

1954 births
Living people
Chief Justices of the Bombay High Court
Chief Justices of the Karnataka High Court
20th-century Indian judges
Chief Justices of the Orissa High Court